Ambassador Theatre may refer to:
 Ambassador Cinema, Dublin
 Ambassador Theatre (New York City)
 Ambassador Theater (Washington, D.C.)
 Ambassador Theatre (St. Louis)
 Ambassadors Theatre (London)
 Ambassadors Theatre (Perth)